Freemasonry in North Macedonia re-emerged in the 1990s, after the collapse of communism in South Eastern Europe.

Today, there are four bodies of Freemasonry represented in North Macedonia:

 Grand Lodge of Macedonia (in amity with UGLE)
 , lodge "Вистина - La Vérité" (under GODF)
 Grand Lodge of Freemasonry for Men and Women in North Macedonia (Co-Freemasonry)
 Regular Grand Lodge of Macedonia (independent)

References